Sekhemre-Wepmaat Intef-Aa (sometimes Intef V) was an Ancient Egyptian pharaoh of the 17th Dynasty of Egypt, who lived late during the Second Intermediate Period, when Egypt was divided into two by Hyksos controlled Lower Egypt and Theban ruled Upper Egypt.

Biography
Sekhemre-Wepmaat Intef is sometimes referred to as Intef V, and sometimes as Intef VI. His nomen, Intef-Aa, translates as "His father brought him, the great" or "Intef, the great." His name may also render as Inyotef-aa.
 
He ruled from Thebes and was probably buried in a tomb in the necropolis of Dra' Abu el-Naga'.

Family
It is assumed that Sekhemre-Wepmaat Intef-aa and Nubkheperre Intef were brothers, due to the inscription of Nubkheperre on the coffin of Intef-aa. Furthermore, it is assumed that Nubkheperre, and also Intef-aa, were sons of a king called Sobekemsaf, based on an inscription from a doorjamb from a 17th Dynasty temple at Gebel Antef. Two kings named Sobekemsaf are known, Sobekemsaf I and Sobekemsaf II, and it is believed that the doorjamb refers to Sekhemre Shedtawy Sobekemsaf (Sobekemsaf II).

Burial

Pyramid
At Dra Abu el-Naga, the Pyramid of Sekhemre-Wepmaat Intef-aa has not been located. Sekhemre-Wepmaat Intef-aa's pyramidion was found inscribed with the king's name and had a slope of 60 degrees. The pyramidion is now in the British Museum (BM EA 478). The pyramid tomb of his brother Nubkheperre Intef was found in 2001.

Coffin and burial equipment
The coffin of Sekhemre-Wepmaat Intef-aa (Louvre E 3019) was a rishi coffin discovered in the 19th century by inhabitants of Kurna. The coffin preserved an inscription which reveals that this king's brother Nubkheperre Intef buried – and thus succeeded – him. Sekhemre-Wepmaat Intef-aa's canopic chest was also found. The Priesse Papyrus was found inside the rishi coffin.

References

External links
Sekhemre Wepmaat's titulary

16th-century BC Pharaohs
Pharaohs of the Seventeenth Dynasty of Egypt